Chilombo may refer to:

Albums
Chilombo (album), 2020 studio album by Jhené Aiko

American singers
 Miyoko Chilombo (born 1981) the 1990–1993 (former) Kidsongs Kid
 Jahi Chilombo (born 1984) the 1992–1993 (former) Kidsongs Kid
 Miyagi Chilombo (born 1986) the 1993 (former) Kidsongs Kid
 Jamila Chilombo (born 1982), a.k.a. Mila J
 Jhene Aiko Chilombo (born 1988), a.k.a. Jhené Aiko